Live Free or Die is an American reality series hosted by The National Geographic Channel that follows the lives of five primitive individuals and one couple who live in the country's most remote backwoods and swamps. Each individual or couple is trying to live or survive in an extreme rural environment freed from the constraints of technology and relying completely on nature to give them everything they need to survive. The series is produced by National Geographic Studios (formerly known as National Geographic Television) and airs on National Geographic.

The individuals who make up the program leave the industrialized world behind, while sustaining themselves through hunting, fishing and bartering, living in the forest and surviving off of the land. Each character highlights the use of primitive tools for foraging, trapping, and building.  The characters of the series live a gritty existence in shelters with only raw materials found, created or traded for.

Each individual brings to the show a knowledge of survival skills and is isolated from the outside world. Each individual or couple lives without running water or electricity while hunting and foraging for food.

Each participant offers clever survival tips and advice as a cameraman follows them through everyday tasks.  Whether it is checking animal traps, or making one's own mosquito repellent, each attempts to demonstrates how to survive, with no script and no agenda.

"We rarely do retakes unless the cameraman has to change his lens," said Colbert Sturgeon of Moultrie, Georgia, who was approached by National Geographic to do the show. Designed for the increasing number of people interested in survivalism, Live Free or Die ended in 2016 after 28 episodes and 3 seasons.

The primitive individuals in the series were selected based on a self-reliant criteria as to who could demonstrate a "do more with less" philosophy. The woods furnish the individuals' rugged lifestyle, as they are faced with natural obstacles like brutal weather and depleted food sources. According to the creed of the show, nature "fuels their desire to remain on the modern-day frontier." 

The cast includes:

 Colbert Sturgeon, of Moultrie, Georgia
 Thorn, who lives deep in the Blue Ridge Mountains
 Tony and Amelia Stevens, who also live in the Blue Ridge Mountains
 Derik Stevens, a mountain man living off-the-grid, twenty miles from Boulder, Colorado
 Tobias Corwin, a desert primitive survival skills expert living outside of Prescott, Arizona
 Matt Graham

The show is rooted in the premise that capitalist society is, in effect, broken, as the film crew follows a handful of people living in extreme anti-modern fashion.  The show emphasizes experimental living, which was once the norm but feels radical in a modern context.

Though the show shows the gritty consumption of rats and berries in a "sustainable" platform, even one of the characters cannot afford the true primitive life, as Colbert raises money from his GoFundMe page.

References

2014 American television series debuts
2010s American reality television series
2020s American reality television series
National Geographic (American TV channel) original programming
Works about survival skills